Tenthredo temula is a sawfly species of the family Tenthredinidae (common sawflies), subfamily Tenthredininae.

Distribution
This sawfly is a Euro-siberian species, widespread in most of European countries.

Habitat
This species can be found in hedgerows and meadows.

Description

The thorax and head are brilliant black, clypeus, labrum and the base of mandibles are yellow, the abdomen is black with a transversal yellow band and a yellow tip. Femora and tibia are black in males, respectively black and yellow in females. The wings are brown and transparent, with brown veins and black stigma.

Biology
They can be encountered from May through late summer feeding on small insects and on nectar and pollen of flowers from various plants (mainly family Apiaceae, as Anthriscus sylvestris, Hogweed (Heracleum sphondylium), but also on Rubus fruticosus and Crataegus monogyna. Larvae develop on plants of the genus Ligustrum.

References

 Magis N. (2003): Notes faunistiques sur les espèces du genre Tenthredo Linné, 1758 sensu lato dans la région franco-rhénane (Hymenoptera Symphyta : Tenthredinidae, Tenthredininae), Notes fauniques de Gembloux, n° 53  [as Tenthredo temula Scopoli, 1763]

Tenthredinidae
Insects described in 1763
Hymenoptera of Europe
Taxa named by Giovanni Antonio Scopoli